Malipukur is a Village in Arambagh community development block in Arambagh subdivision of Hooghly district in the state of West Bengal, India. It is under Arambagh police station.

Geography

Gram panchayat

Villages and census towns in Gangadharpur gram panchayat are: Bankrishnapur, Gangadharpur, Malipukur and Manirampur.

Market: Ganngadharpur Bazar, Hajaghata, Manirampur.

Demographics
As per 2011 Census of India, Malipukur had a total population of 945 of which 498 (53%) were males and 447 (47%) were females. Population below 6 years was 100. The total number of literates in Malipukur was 658 (77.87% of the population over 6 years).

Transport
The nearest railway station is Baruipara railway station on the Howrah-Bardhaman chord which is a part of the Kolkata Suburban Railway system.

The main road is 31 Number Road  It is the main artery of the town and it is connected to NH2 19 (old number NH 2)/ Durgapur Expressway and Grand Trunk Road.

There is 31 number bus service from Jangipara bus stand to Serampore bus stand via Sehakhala, Banmalipur, Gangadharpur, Baruipara, Bora.

References

Villages in Chanditala I CD Block